Daniel Börtz (born 8 August 1943) is a Swedish composer, born in Hässleholm.

He studied composition under Hilding Rosenberg, Karl-Birger Blomdahl and Ingvar Lidholm. Among his works are the operas Bacchanterna (1991), Marie Antoinette (1998) and Goya (2009). His Sinfonia 13 was performed by the Royal Stockholm Philharmonic Orchestra in 2019.

Students 
Marie Samuelsson

References

External links

Börtz biography at his publisher (Gehrmans Musikförlag)

1943 births
20th-century classical composers
21st-century classical composers
Litteris et Artibus recipients
Living people
Swedish opera composers
Male opera composers
Swedish classical composers
Swedish male classical composers
International Rostrum of Composers prize-winners
20th-century Swedish male musicians
20th-century Swedish musicians
21st-century Swedish male musicians
Musikförläggarnas pris winners